Vjenceslav Novak (11 September 1859 in Senj – 20 September 1905 in Zagreb) was a Croatian Realist writer, dramatist, and music historian.

He was born into an emigrant Czech family, of which his mother was from an emigrant Bavarian family. He was the most successful Croatian realist writer and was known as the Croatian Balzac. He finished elementary and middle school in Senj and Gospić. He also worked as a teacher in Senj for some time.

He entered into literature in 1881 with his novella  Maca. He wrote seven novels. He published thirty novellas. Apart from stories he also wrote poetry, feuilleton, dramatic works, reviews, critiques and musical arrangements.

In 1892 he initiated (jointly with Vjekoslav Klaić) the music periodical Gusle: Časopis za svjetovnu i crkvenu gasbu, which he coedited with Klaić. The periodical was published only for a year, but next year he started a new journal Glazba: List za crkvenu i svjetovnu gazbu te dramatsku umetnost, which he edited alone. This periodical ceased its publication at the end of 1893. 

He had a large family, suffered from tuberculosis, fought poverty, and during this period of his life was an average writer of that time. He was a novelist, narrator, critic and translator and worked right up until his death in 1905. He started out as a Romantic story-teller and ended up a writer of modern psychological prose with occult themes.

Works
 Novels:
 Pavao Šegota
 Pod Nehajem
 Posljednji Stipančići  (Matica hrvatska, 1899, Agram

 Dva svijeta
 Tito Dorčić
 Nikola Baretić

External links
 Biography

1859 births
1905 deaths
People from Senj
Croatian dramatists and playwrights
Croatian novelists
Male novelists
Croatian male short story writers
Croatian short story writers
Croatian male writers
Burials at Mirogoj Cemetery
19th-century novelists
19th-century dramatists and playwrights
19th-century short story writers
19th-century male writers

Croatian people of Czech descent 
Croatian people of German descent